FRF may refer to:

Places
 Fairfield railway station (Greater Manchester), in England
 Rhein-Main Air Base (FRF is its OACI airport codename) a former United States airbase in Germany, near Frankfurt.
 ISO 3166-2:FR-F (Centre-Val de Loire)

People
 Faculty research fellow

Groups and organizations 

 Romanian Football Federation
 Foundation for Religious Freedom, the entity controlling the New Cult Awareness Network

Science and technology
 Francium fluoride (FrF), a hypothetical fluoride of the highly radioactive element francium
 Frequency response function
 Frequency reuse factor

Other 
 French franc (French: Franc Français), the currency of France in use before the Euro
 Fuji Rock Festival, in Niigata Prefecture, Japan

See also

 FFR (disambiguation)
 RFF (disambiguation)